Inanidrilus manae is a species of annelid worm. It is known from subtidal coral sands in Fiji, in the Pacific Ocean.

References

manae
Fauna of Fiji
Taxa named by Christer Erséus
Fauna of the Pacific Ocean
Animals described in 1984